The Tis Hazari metro station is a metro station located on the Red Line of Delhi Metro. It is situated in the Tis Hazari area of Central Delhi. The station is situated just across the road from the Tis Hazari Courts Complex, which is the principal district court of Delhi. It is connected to gate number 2 of the complex by a footbridge. The footbridge has a ramp available for the disabled or physically challenged people.

History
The Tis Hazari metro station was one of the first six metro stations on Delhi Metro's network. The DMRC had begun its commercial operations on December 25, 2002, a day after then prime minister Atal Bihari Vajpayee had inaugurated its first stretch spanning 8.2 kilometres from Shahdara to Tis Hazari on the Red Line.

Station layout

Facilities

Toilets: The station has a Sulabh toilet located near gate no. 3.

Exits

Connections

Bus
DTC bus routes number 17, 88, 102, 106, 107, 109, 114, 115, 116, 117, 119, 123, 124, 125, 125EXT, 126, 127, 128, 129, 131, 128, 129, 131, 133, 134, 136, 137, 138, 141, 142, 144, 146, 147, 148, 149, 154, 161, 172, 175, 182A, 182ACL, 183, 184, 194, 197, 199, 208, 218, 219EXT, 219STL, 231, 0236, 236, 236EXT, 247, 721, 792, 805A, 816, 816A, 817N, 823, 841, 842, 847, 863, 863SPL, 905, 905A, 906, 907, 922, 922A, 923, 924, 925, 0926, 926, 929, 937A, 939, 942, 942E and 992 serve the station from nearby Tis Hazari Court bus stop.

Rail
Sadar Bazar railway station of Indian Railways is situated around 1.7 km away from the metro station.

Incidents
 28 May 2012 - Robbery and murder outside the Tis Hazari station.
 3 June 2012 - Seven gangsters arrested.

Gallery

See also
List of Delhi Metro stations
Transport in Delhi

References

External links

 Delhi Metro Rail Corporation Ltd. (Official site)
 Delhi Metro Annual Reports

Delhi Metro stations
Railway stations opened in 2002
2002 establishments in Delhi
Railway stations in North Delhi district